Mamta or Mamata may refer to:

Films and television
 Mamta (1936 film), see Bollywood films of the 1930s
 Mamta (1942 film)
 Mamta (1952 film)
 Mamta (1965 film), see Bollywood films of 1965
 Mamta (1966 film) 
 Mamta (TV series), a serial appearing on the Indian Zee TV satellite television network

Given name
 Mamta Kulkarni, former Bollywood actress
 Mamta Mohandas, South Indian actress
 Mamta Sagar, Indian poet and playwright
 Mamata Bala Thakur, former Member of Parliament, Lok Sabha from Bangaon
 Mamata Banerjee, Chief Minister of West Bengal and former Member of Parliament, Lok Sabha
 Mamata Bhunia, member of the West Bengal Legislative Assembly
 Mamata Dash, Odia poet
 Mamata Mohanta, Member of Parliament, Rajya Sabha from Odisha
 Mamata Roy, former member of the West Bengal Legislative Assembly
 Mamata Shankar, Bengali actress and classical dancer

Other uses
 Mamta, Tibet